Alain Cudini (born 19 April 1946) is a French former racing driver.

References

1946 births
Living people
Sportspeople from Colombes
French racing drivers
European Formula Two Championship drivers
24 Hours of Le Mans drivers
Deutsche Tourenwagen Masters drivers
World Sportscar Championship drivers
24 Hours of Spa drivers

Racing Bart Mampaey drivers
Sauber Motorsport drivers